Ojibwa Island (formerly Squaw Island) is an island in Lake Michigan and is part of the Beaver Island archipelago. The island is about 75 acres in size, and is privately owned.   Ojibwa Island is located a little under two miles north east of Whiskey Island, and a little over three miles west of Garden Island.

The historic Squaw Island Light is located on the north point of the Island.

Climate

References 

 
Islands of Lake Michigan in Michigan
Islands of Charlevoix County, Michigan
Private islands of Michigan
Private islands of the Great Lakes